Beaumont-sur-Sarthe (literally Beaumont on Sarthe; pre-revolutionary name: Beaumont-le-Vicomte) is a commune in the Sarthe department and Pays de la Loire region of north-western France.

The residents of Beaumont are known in French as les Belmontais.

Geography
As the name indicates, Beaumont lies on the river Sarthe. The town is situated midway between Alençon (23 km) and Le Mans (25 km). Ballon and Fresnay-sur-Sarthe are each 10 km away, Sillé-le-Guillaume is 20 km and Mamers 22 km away.

Twin towns
 Beaumont-sur-Sarthe is twinned with the town of Burgh le Marsh in Lincolnshire, England.

See also
Communes of the Sarthe department

References

Communes of Sarthe
Maine (province)